Gavialiceps is a genus of eels in the pike conger family, Muraenesocidae.

Species
There are currently five recognized species in this genus:

 Gavialiceps arabicus (D'Ancona, 1928)
 Gavialiceps bertelseni Karmovskaya, 1993
 Gavialiceps javanicus Karmovskaya, 1993 (Duckbill conger)
 Gavialiceps taeniola Alcock, 1889
 Gavialiceps taiwanensis (J. S. T. F. Chen & H. T. C. Weng, 1967)

References

Muraenesocidae